Karate Cop is a 1991 direct-to-video martial arts action film. It is the sequel to the film Omega Cop. It is set in the post-apocalyptic near-future about a karate-trained police officer struggling to keep order in a chaotic, unstable totalitarian society. It stars Ronald L. Marchini in the main role; David Carradine makes a cameo appearance.

Plot
After an environmental holocaust caused by solar flares nearly destroyed the Earth the atmosphere is ridden with solar radiation and global temperatures had risen greatly. This catastrophe left almost every human on earth dead, devastated the environment, and causes societal collapse. Crime rates have drastically increased, and the few human beings left have decided to fend for themselves and much of the world has seen the rise of gangs of rampaging marauders. In post-apocalyptic America, the once-stable society has become a corrupt, crime-ridden totalitarian wasteland. The few remaining citizens are either hiding in devastated urban areas or are controlled by various gangs that now rule the cities with an iron fist. A former cop, John Travis, is a martial arts expert and spends his days undercover, walking across the barren urban landscape. Travis is doing his best to maintain some kind of order as the gangs slowly weed each other out by fighting in large arenas to create the most powerful gang and thus control the country.

Cast
 Ronald L. Marchini as John Travis
 Carrie Chambers as Rachel
 Michael E. Bristow as Snaker
 D.W. Landingham as Lincoln
 Michael M. Foley as Lincoln's Champion
 Dana Bentley as Lincoln's Woman
 Dax Nicholas as Cal
 David Carradine as Dad
 Vibbe Haugaard as Mica
 Warren Reed as Fat Scav
 Jeffrey K. Lee as Sneaker
 Lorraine Swanson as Tess
 Denny Grayson as Priest
 Kelli Gianettoni as Dancing Dahlia
 Stephen W. Sargent as Danny
 Chris Ost as Cardplayer #1
 Mark Stevens as Cardplayer #2
 Frank O. Montelongo as Poolplayer #1
 Michael Pyper as Poolplayer #2
 J. D. Bristow as Black T-shirt
 Christopher John Reynolds as Last Attacker

Release
The film was a direct-to-video release, so the number of units sold is unknown. The film did not receive much attention and nearly slipped into obscurity; however, it has since been rediscovered and gained a small cult following. The film received mixed to negative reviews from critics, who criticized the film for its acting and plot. However, almost all critics have praised the film for its carefully researched and extensively choreographed action sequences.

Rifftrax has released a riffed version of the movie on September 24, 2019.

External links 
 
 
 

1991 films
American martial arts films
Karate films
1990s action films
American science fiction action films
Martial arts science fiction films
American post-apocalyptic films
1991 martial arts films
1990s English-language films
1990s American films